David A. Martin is an American lawyer currently the Warner-Booker Distinguished Professor of International Law Emeritus at University of Virginia School of Law after 36 years of teaching his interests involve are constitutional and international law and immigration and also previously a Department of Homeland Security advisor and is known as a significant figure in policy on refugees and immigration. He published an article in The Washington Post in 2012 regarding immigration policy. He made headlines in 2018 along with three colleagues for resigning from the Homeland Security Advisory Council in protest of the Trump administration separating families at the US-Mexico border.

Life & Education
He was born to Indiana state senator Charles Wendell Martin and grew up in Indianapolis. After graduating from DePauw University in 1970 and Yale Law School and 1975, he worked under Judges J. Skelly Wright and also Lewis F. Powell Jr.

Publications
 “Improving the Exercise of the Attorney General’s Immigration Referral Power: Lessons from the Battle over the ‘Categorical Approach’ to Classifying Crimes,” 102 Iowa L. Rev. Online 1 (2016).
 “Resolute Enforcement Is Not Just for Restrictionists: Building a Stable and Efficient Immigration Enforcement System,” 30 J.L. & Pol. 411 (2015).
 “Why Immigration’s Plenary Power Doctrine Endures,” 68 Okla. L. Rev. 29 (2015).

References

External links
Immigration policy interview

Year of birth missing (living people)
Living people
University of Virginia School of Law faculty
American lawyers
DePauw University alumni
Yale Law School alumni